Kamatha is a Kamboja king mentioned in the Mahābhārata as one of the principal Kshatriyas taking part in the battle.

References

See also
Srindra Varmana Kamboj
Chandravarma
Sudakshina

Characters in the Mahabharata
Kambojas